P. roseus may refer to:
 Pericrocotus roseus, the rosy minivet, a bird species
 Phoenicopterus roseus, the greater flamingo, a bird species

See also
 Roseus (disambiguation)